The Niantic River is a mainly tidal river in eastern Connecticut. It is crossed by the Niantic River Bridge carrying Amtrak's Northeast Corridor. It separates the towns of East Lyme and Waterford. The distance from the end of Banning Cove to the Niantic River Bridge is approximately 3.4 miles.

There are many other water features that drain out into the Niantic River such as Oil Mill Brook and Stony Brook. The Niantic River itself, empties out into the Long Island Sound.

About 12,000 years ago there were humans that lived along the river way before any European settler came. These people were known as the Western Nehantics. They survived on the river's bounty of shellfish, fish, and other marine life. One of the rivers most well known shellfish, the scallop, is now in decline. The river also has a variety of birds such as  bald eagles, osprey, egrets, herons, and cormorants. Some fish that are good to catch in the river are flounder, hickory shad, and striped bass. The Niantic River has a large difference between high tide in the river and low tide. At some points in the river, at low tide the water goes down to below sea level.

Crossings

See also
List of rivers of Connecticut

References

Rivers of New London County, Connecticut
Connecticut placenames of Native American origin
East Lyme, Connecticut
Estuaries of Connecticut
Waterford, Connecticut
Rivers of Connecticut